Eucrosia calendulina is a species of plant that is endemic to Peru.

All members of the genus Eucrosia grow from bulbs and have stalked (petiolate) leaves with wide blades (laminae).  The zygomorphic flowers are produced in an umbel. The stamens have prominent long filaments.

E. calendulina is known only from the lower limits of the Cachil Forest of Peru. The species is threatened by habitat destruction.

References

External links
 Image of E. calendulina from The International Bulb Society website

Flora of Peru
calendulina
Endangered plants